Dr. József Hevessy (10 October 1931 – 18 July 2005) was a Hungarian politician, who served as Mayor of Debrecen from 1990 to 1998.

References

External links
 Necrology

1931 births
2005 deaths
Alliance of Free Democrats politicians
Mayors of places in Hungary
People from Miskolc
Mayors of Debrecen